Mitchell-Elijah Weiser (born 21 April 1994) is a German professional footballer who plays as a right back for Bundesliga club Werder Bremen.

Club career

Early career
The son of former German footballer Patrick Weiser, Weiser spent his early childhood in Braunschweig, where he played for the youth teams of amateur club TV Eintracht Veltenhof.

1. FC Köln
Weiser started his career in the youth department of 1. FC Köln in the 2005–06 season. He won his first cup with the U-17 team in 2011.

He made his debut in the Bundesliga on 25 February 2012 in a game against Bayer Leverkusen as the youngest player for the club. This is his only appearance for the first team before transferring to Bayern.

Bayern Munich
On 1 June 2012, Weiser moved to Bayern Munich, signing a contract until 2015. On 2 January 2013, he was loaned out to 2. Bundesliga team 1. FC Kaiserslautern until the end of the season.

On his return for Bayern in the 2013–14 season, Weiser scored his first goal for the Bavarians against São Paulo on the 2013 Audi Cup.

On 5 November 2013, he made his UEFA Champions League debut with Bayern Munich in a 1–0 group stage win away to Viktoria Plzeň, coming on as a substitute for Mario Götze in the 87th minute.

On 5 April 2014, he made his first Bundesliga appearance for Bayern. With the championship already won, Weiser was selected in the starting line-up as Bayern lost 1–0 to FC Augsburg, their first loss in a league match since October 2012 to end a record 53-match unbeaten run.

On 21 February 2015, in a 6–0 win against SC Paderborn 07, Weiser scored his first Bundesliga goal in the 78th minute.

Hertha BSC
Weiser signed a three–year contract for Hertha BSC on 17 June 2015. He missed the start of the 2015–16 season after an MRI revealed a "teaser and a sprain of the medial collateral ligament." He debuted for Hertha in a 1–1 draw on matchday two against Werder Bremen. He finished the 2015–16 season with two goals in 33 appearances. Weiser extended his stay at the Olympiastadion until 2020 on 26 August 2016. He scored the first goal in a 2–0 win against Schalke on 18 September 2016. He finished the 2016–17 season four goals in 21 appearances. He finished the 2017–18 season with two goals in 31 appearances.

Bayer Leverkusen
In May 2018, Bayer Leverkusen announced that they have signed Mitchell Weiser from Hertha Berlin for a five-year contract until 2023. On 29 November 2018, he scored his first goal in European competitions in a 1–1 draw against Ludogorets Razgrad in the 2018–19 UEFA Europa League.

Werder Bremen
Weiser joined 2. Bundesliga club Werder Bremen on a season-long loan on 31 August 2021, the last day of the 2021 summer transfer window. He scored on his starting debut on 11 September, scoring the second goal in a 3–0 win against FC Ingolstadt.

He signed with Werder Bremen on a permanent basis in July.

International career
On 10 January 2010, Weiser debuted in the U-16 Germany national team in a 6–0 against Cyprus. He scored his first goal for the U-17 team on 4 September 2010 in a 2–0 against Azerbaijan.

His first international tournament was the 2011 UEFA European U-17 Football Championship in Serbia where the team reached the final against the Netherlands, losing 2–5.

The 2011 FIFA U-17 World Cup in Mexico was his next tournament with the team reaching third place and Weiser ending the tournament with three goals in six matches. His good performance has caught attention of scouts around the world.  His playing style and ability have drawn comparisons to Dani Alves.

Weiser scored the only goal with a header for Germany under-21 team against Spain under-21 team in the 2017 UEFA European Under-21 Championship Final helping the team to clinch their second overall UEFA European Under-21 Championship title.

Personal life
Weiser is of Algerian descent through his mother's side of the family.

Career statistics

Honours
Bayern Munich
 Bundesliga: 2013–14, 2014–15
 DFB-Pokal: 2013–14
 DFL-Supercup: 2012 
 FIFA Club World Cup: 2013

Germany
 UEFA European Under-21 Championship: 2017

Individual
 DFB-Pokal top assist provider: 2015–16

References

External links

 Mitchell Weiser – scouting report

1994 births
Living people
People from Troisdorf
Sportspeople from Cologne (region)
German footballers
Footballers from North Rhine-Westphalia
Association football fullbacks
Association football midfielders
Association football wingers
Germany under-21 international footballers
Germany youth international footballers
Bundesliga players
2. Bundesliga players
Regionalliga players
1. FC Köln players
1. FC Köln II players
FC Bayern Munich footballers
FC Bayern Munich II players
1. FC Kaiserslautern players
Hertha BSC players
Bayer 04 Leverkusen players
SV Werder Bremen players
German people of Algerian descent